Immediate Delivery (Spanish: Entrega inmediata), originally known as Agente XU 777 (English: Agent XU 777) is a 1963 Mexican comedy film directed by Miguel M. Delgado and starring Cantinflas, Gina Romand, Claudio Brook and Fanny Cano. In the film, Cantinflas plays a simple mailman forced to become an international spy. It was the last black and white film made by Cantinflas, although he had already made six color films at the time.

Plot
Feliciano (Cantinflas) is a mailman who is recruited by a secret counterintelligence service (which codenames him Agent XU-777), and must discover an international conspiracy.

He manages to find out that enemy agents, led by Carlota (Gina Romand) and Alex (Claudio Brook), will smuggle a teacher to decipher keys through a coffin. Feliciano is put in charge of the funeral home, but he ends up delivering the coffin to a wrong person, distracting the loyal agents and allowing the enemy to achieve their goal. However, the enemy agents discover that for the deciphering process they also must obtain a specific code.

In a parallel storyline, Feliciano learns that an old compadre of his arrangled for his daughter to go live with Feliciano after his death. Due to a letter from his compadre where he describes his daughter as his "bebé" ("baby"), Feliciano assumes that his compadre’s daughter is an infant, even buying a crib and milk for the impending arrival. However, much to his surprise, he ends up discovering that his compadre’s daughter is actually a young woman nicknamed "Bebé" (Fanny Cano), and they end developing a romantic relationship. The enemy agents then kidnap Bebé to force Feliciano to betray his homeland and give the code to the enemy.

Cast
Cantinflas as Feliciano / Agent XU 777
Gina Romand as Carlota
Claudio Brook as Alex
Fanny Cano as Bebé
Guillermo Zetina as Head of Counterintelligence
María Amelia Ramírez as Agent 30-30 (as María Amelia Ramírez "Miss Argentina")
Emma Roldán as Doña Angustias
Quintín Bulnes as Agent
María Herrero
André Toffel
Maricarmen Vela as Mercedes
Xavier Massé
Guillermo Rivas as Spy (as Guillermo Rivas "El Borras")
Jorge Russek as Spy
Armando Gutiérrez
José Wilhelmy
Adolfo Aguilar
Alberto Catalá as Professor
Ángel Merino
Jorge Mondragón as Funeral Home Client
Manuel Zozaya
Francisco Reiguera as Odilón Campos Santos
Ramón Valdés as Original Agent XU 777
Julián de Meriche as Waiter (as Julién de Meriche)
Rafael de Córdoba as Dancer
Carlos León as Agent
Hermanos Fernández

References

Bibliography
Agrasánchez, Rogelio. Beauties of Mexican Cinema. Agrasanchez Film Archive, 2001.
Pilcher, Jeffrey M. Cantinflas and the Chaos of Mexican Modernity. Rowman & Littlefield, 2001.

External links

1960s action comedy films
1960s parody films
1960s spy comedy films
Mexican comedy films
Films directed by Miguel M. Delgado
1963 comedy films
1963 films
1960s Spanish-language films
1960s Mexican films